William Curfield Lockett (23 April 1893–1974) was an English footballer who played in the Football League for Northampton Town and Wolverhampton Wanderers.

References

1893 births
1974 deaths
English footballers
Association football forwards
English Football League players
Wolverhampton Wanderers F.C. players
Northampton Town F.C. players
Kidderminster Harriers F.C. players